Jean Mary Moore (8 November 1933 – 26 November 2016) was an Australian politician.

She was born in Evandale, Tasmania. In 1992 she was elected to the Tasmanian Legislative Council as the independent member for Hobart, holding the seat until her defeat by Labor candidate Doug Parkinson in 1994.

References

1933 births
2016 deaths
Independent members of the Parliament of Tasmania
Members of the Tasmanian Legislative Council
Women members of the Tasmanian Legislative Council